FK Daugava or Daugava Riga may refer to:

Football
 FC Daugava Riga (1944–1990)
 FK Pārdaugava (1991–1995)
 Torpedo Rīga (1996–2000)
 Policijas FK (2001)
 FK RFS (2008–2011)
 FK Daugava (2003) (2012–2015 as FK Daugava Rīga)
 FC Daugava (2006–present)

Basketball
 TTT RIga, known as Daugava Riga internationally